An ambulance bus is a type of ambulance with the capacity to transport and treat multiple patients. An ambulance bus is used primarily for medical evacuation of mass casualty incidents and non-emergency medical transport of care-dependent patients, and can also be used for specific problems such as drunk patients in town centres.

Applications

Mass casualty incident

In the event of a major disaster or evacuation, an ambulance bus can be used to transport multiple patients to the hospital. The vehicle may be equipped with advanced life support systems. Likewise, during an evacuation in advance of a disaster, an ambulance bus can transfer patients in hospitals and nursing homes to care centers out of harm's way.

Non-emergency transport
An ambulance bus can be used in a transport role to allow stretcher-bound patients to leave the hospital, such as taking excursions or holidays away from the hospital, while still being able to provide the necessary medical care during the journey.

Conversion of existing vehicles 
Existing vehicles like buses can be converted into an ambulance bus with the installation of an on-demand ambulance bus kit. On-demand ambulance bus kits are installed inside any available vehicle on an as-needed basis when the need is anticipated in advance, like in the case of hurricanes or planned hospital maintenance. These kits can be installed temporarily or permanently.

See also 

 Aid station
 Field hospital
 Mobile hospital
 Nontransporting EMS vehicle

References

Bus
Buses by type